Elvin Grey is the stage name of Radik Yulyakshin, a Russian pop singer and producer of Bashkir descent.

Radik Yulyakshin was born in Ufa into an ethnic Bashkir construction worker family. He graduated from the Moscow State Pedagogical University.

In 2006, he released his first album. Every year between 2006 and 2012, Yulyakshin was named Singer of the Year in Bashkortostan. In 2011, he relocated to Moscow. In 2016, Yulyakshin was named Person of Culture of the Year in Tatarstan.

In 2017, he received the title Merited Artist of Bashkortostan.

References

External links
 Official website

Bashkir people
Tatar-language singers
Music of Bashkortostan
1989 births
Living people